The 2007 UCF Knights football team represented the University of Central Florida in the 2007 NCAA Division I FBS football season. Their head coach was George O'Leary, in his fourth season with the school. The season was highlighted by the completion of their new on-campus stadium. The Knights moved out of the aging Citrus Bowl in downtown Orlando, and began playing their home games at Bright House Networks Stadium, located on the main campus of UCF in east Orlando, Florida. In addition, the team changed its nickname from "Golden Knights" back to simply "Knights." From its inception in 1979 to 1992, the football team had been known as the Knights, then used the name "Golden Knights" from 1993 until 2006.

The Knights were led on offense by quarterback Kyle Israel and Consensus All-American running back Kevin Smith. Smith rushed for 2,567 yards, a single-season school record, and just 61 yards shy of Barry Sanders' all-time NCAA record. UCF's inaugural game in their new stadium was a nationally-televised contest against the No. 6 Texas Longhorns. In a back and forth game, they lost by only a field goal.

UCF went 9–3 in the regular season (7–1 in C-USA), with their only conference loss being at East Carolina. They won the C-USA Eastern Division, their second division crown in three years. They would go on to host the C-USA Championship Game for the second time. Taking revenge on Tulsa for beating them two years prior, UCF won the game 44–25, to claim their first Conference USA championship title.

UCF was invited to the Liberty Bowl to face Mississippi State. In a low-scoring game, their defense held the game close, but the offense was unable to re-fire. UCF fell by the score of 10–3.

After the conclusion of the season, Kevin Smith decided to forgo his senior season, and entered the 2008 NFL Draft. He was selected with the first pick of the third round by the Detroit Lions.

Schedule

Game summaries

NC State

The NC State Wolfpack played the Knights for the first game of the season. This is the first game where the UCF Knights played with their new logo and white helmet, and also marked UCF's first win over an ACC opponent. it was also the first win over a BCS AQ team since George O'Leary became head coach.

Texas

This was the first meeting between the Texas Longhorns and the UCF Knights. Texas was the first opponent in the Knights new stadium, Bright House Networks Stadium, and the 2007 game was to be the first of three scheduled meetings between the schools.

During the game, lightning spotted near the stadium caused a fifteen‑minute delay. The game was a back-and-forth contest. Texas took an early 3-point lead and then UCF made a touchdown to go ahead 7–3. The Longhorns led 20–10 at halftime, but the Knights came back to take a 24–23 lead early in the fourth quarter. Texas then scored two field goals and a touchdown and appeared to be on the way to running out the clock before a Jamaal Charles fumble gave the Knights the ball back with about two minutes left in regulation. UCF scored a touchdown and a two-point conversion to cut Texas' lead to 35–32 with 35 seconds remaining. When the Knights were unable to recover their onside kick attempt, Texas was able to run out the clock and preserve their three-point victory.

Jamaal Charles of Texas rushed 22 times for 157 yards and UCF's Kevin Smith rushed 27 times for 150 yards. Colt McCoy completed 68% of his passes for a total of 227 yards; UCF's Kyle Israel completed 35% of his passes for a total of 133 yards.

Memphis

This was the first Conference USA game for both teams. UCF took a strong lead early in the game, with the halftime score at 42-0, and a lead at one point of 49-0. The UCF Knights have beaten Memphis every time they have played them since joining Conference USA three years ago.  During the game Kyle Israel and freshman Michael Greco were used in tandem at quarterback, and their success in the game drew immediate comparisons to Chris Leak and Tim Tebow at Florida the previous year.

Louisiana-Lafayette

UCF took a commanding lead of 30-6 into halftime, but this time permitting the winless Louisiana-Lafayette team within 20 was more concerning. After the game, Coach O'Leary resolved to remind his team of the importance of playing hard all four quarters of the game, which would be important especially with two road games coming up.

East Carolina

After going into the half up 28-17, UCF took a surprising downturn with five turnovers in the third quarter: 2 Kyle Israel interceptions, one Michael Greco interception, and two lost fumbles between Israel and running back Kevin Smith.  ECU outscored UCF 28-3 in the third to take the win.

South Florida

South Florida came into the game ranked #5 in both the AP and Coaches Polls going into the game, but UCF would not hold the game as close as they did when they faced then-#6 Texas.  UCF scored their only offensive points—a Kyle Israel rush for a touchdown, and a field goal—in the first half.  UCF and USF would also exchange safeties, but South Florida held a commanding lead at halftime and proceeded to rout the Knights in the second half, with USF's second- and third-string QBs throwing long touchdown passes against a demoralized UCF defense en route to a 64-12 thrashing of the Knights.  UCF was held to just 145 yards total offense, while South Florida used several big plays to dominate the UCF defense, advancing 543 total yards even though UCF controlled the ball for three minutes longer than South Florida.

South Florida emerged #2 in the BCS and AP Polls, and #3 in the Coaches and Harris Polls.

Tulsa

UCF broke free of the two-game losing streak at home against the Tulsa Golden Hurricane, taking the lead in the 2nd quarter and never looking back. Kyle Israel completed 21 of 29 for 229 yards, passing and running for touchdowns, and Kevin Smith rushed for 178 yards with three running touchdowns, catching another. Michael Torres kicked three field goals.

Southern Miss

UCF's defense intercepted Southern Miss quarterback Stephen Reaves three times, and Kevin Smith ran the ball a UCF-record 43 times for 175 yards and two touchdowns. Smith reasserted himself as the nation's #2 rusher, and the Junior tailback took the school's career rushing yards record (3,372). UCF minimized its mistakes, getting through the game without turning the ball over for the first time since their first game against NC State.

Marshall

This was the Homecoming game for UCF, and was the first time that all of the Homecoming festivities, including the Homecoming parade, occurred on campus. The Knights rolled over the Herd in this game. On one series, after Marshall had punted to the UCF 1, Kevin Smith rushed for 12 yards to the UCF 13. On the next play, Smith ran up the middle, cut to his right and raced down the sideline to UCF's longest-ever run from scrimmage and a touchdown.

UAB

UCF traveled to Birmingham and went on to defeat UAB in a hard-fought game. The 2-8 Blazers proved troublesome for the Knights, but UCF finished them off towards the end of the fourth quarter. Earlier in the day, Marshall defeated ECU giving UCF the lead in the C-USA East Division, and due to a blowout win over Houston by Tulsa, the Knights are set to host the Conference Championship at their new on-campus stadium. Kevin Smith broke more records this game. He had 320 yards, 41 carries, and 4 touchdowns. He became the state of Florida's all-time single season rushing yards leader. He won the ESPN All-America Player of the Week for his effort.

SMU

Khymest Williams started the game off with a 99-yard kickoff return for a touchdown for the Knights. After trading scores through the first quarter, UCF took control of the game.  Kevin Smith ran in two touchdowns, and Johnell Neal intercepted a pass and ran it back 72 yards for a touchdown in the third quarter.

UTEP

Despite suffering a 100-yard interception returned for a touchdown, UCF beat UTEP 36-20. Aided by two late touchdowns, UCF sealed the victory, their sixth straight. With the win, UCF clinched the Conference USA East Division crown, and will host the 2007 C-USA Championship against West Division winner Tulsa.

Kevin Smith rushed for 219 yards, continuing to add to his historic season.

Conference USA Championship

Tulsa and UCF met at the C-USA Championship for the second time; Tulsa beat UCF at the Florida Citrus Bowl in Downtown Orlando in 2005.

Kevin Smith continued his dominance, running for 284 yards with 4 touchdowns.  Tulsa kept it close in the first half as UCF's defense seemed slow to get started.  In the second half, however, they only scored on a safety.  Paul Smith, the Tulsa quarterback, threw for 426 yards and three touchdowns, but also gave up three interceptions.  UCF won their first ever conference title in football.

Kevin Smith finished the game with 2,448 rushing yards on the season, second all-time for single-season rushing yards in FBS history. Only Barry Sanders, who rushed for 2,628 yards in 1988 for Oklahoma State, has rushed for more yards in a single season.

Liberty Bowl

With their Conference USA championship, UCF got an automatic berth at the AutoZone Liberty Bowl in Memphis, Tennessee on December 29, 2007.  It was just their second ever bowl game.  They faced Mississippi State from the Southeastern Conference.

After trading 2nd-quarter field goals, neither team scored again until MSU's Anthony Dixon leapt into the endzone for a one-yard touchdown run with under two minutes remaining to put Mississippi State up by the final score.

Kevin Smith tried for Barry Sanders' single-season rushing record but was shy of it by 61 yards, finishing with 119 yards rushing against MSU. He was one of only four players to rush for over 100 yards on MSU's defense all season.

Awards & Milestones
In addition to winning the Conference USA title, UCF and its players won several other awards. Head coach George O'Leary was named C-USA Coach of the Year for the second time. Having twice won ACC Coach of the Year, O'Leary has now been awarded coach of the year four times, trailing only South Carolina's Steve Spurrier (six) and Utah's Dennis Erickson (six) among active FBS coaches.

All-Conference teams
C-USA First Team: Kevin Smith, Leger Douzable, Joe Burnett, Michael Buscemi
C-USA Second Team: Josh Sitton, Kyle Smith, Keith Shologan, Sha'Reff Rashad

School records
Best record: 9–3 (regular season), 10–4 (final including bowl game)
Best regular season conference record: 7–1 (T–2005)

Offseason

NFL Draft
Three former players were selected in the 2008 NFL Draft:

References

UCF
UCF Knights football seasons
Conference USA football champion seasons
UCF Knights football